The year 2004 is the 3rd year in the history of the Cage Rage Championships, a mixed martial arts promotion based in the United Kingdom. In 2004 Cage Rage Championships held 5 events, Cage Rage 5.

Title fights

Events list

Cage Rage 5

Cage Rage 5 was an event held on February 15, 2004, at Caesar's Nightclub in Streatham, United Kingdom.

Results

Cage Rage 6

Cage Rage 6 was an event held on May 23, 2004, at Caesar's Nightclub in Streatham, United Kingdom.

Results

Cage Rage 7

Cage Rage 7 was an event held on July 10, 2004, at Wembley Conference Centre in London, United Kingdom.

Results

Cage Rage 8

Cage Rage 8 was an event held on September 11, 2004, at Wembley Conference Centre in London, United Kingdom.

Results

Cage Rage 9

Cage Rage 9 was an event held on November 27, 2004, at Wembley Conference Centre in London, United Kingdom.

Results

See also 
 Cage Rage Championships
 List of Cage Rage champions
 List of Cage Rage events

References

Cage Rage Championships events
2004 in mixed martial arts